Zaanse Vereniging De Zaan is a Dutch water polo club from Zaandam. Originally established in 1893 as ZZC Neptunes, in 1987 it merged with Kroosduikers, changing its name to ZZC Alliance. In 1912 ZC Nereus was established and in 1995 it merged with Zaanlandse Water Vrienden, changing its name to ZWV Nereus. It took its current name in 2012 after merging with ZZC Alliance. The club is best known for its women's team, which enjoyed its golden era through the 1990s, winning three European Cups and seven national championships between 1989 and 2000.

The new logo is designed by Mark van Westervoort from Studio van Westervoort.

Titles
 Women:
 LEN Champions' Cup (3): 
 1990, 1995, 1996
 Dutch Leagues (7): 
 1989, 1993, 1994, 1995, 1996, 1997, 2001

References

Water polo clubs in the Netherlands
Sports clubs established in 1912
1912 establishments in the Netherlands
Sports clubs in North Holland
Sport in Zaanstad
Zaandam